Reesor may refer to:

Reesor is a surname. Reesor is an altered spelling of Swiss German surname, Reusser, an occupational name for a fisherman or maker of fish traps.

Peter Reesor, founder of Markham, Ontario
David Reesor, Ontario businessman and political figure
John Reesor Williams, former politician in Ontario, Canada
Reesor Siding Strike of 1963
Reesor, Ontario
Reesor Lake (Alberta)